Darin Qaleh (also Romanized as Darīn Qal‘eh) is a village in Baranduzchay-ye Jonubi Rural District, in the Central District of Urmia County, West Azerbaijan Province, Iran. At the 2006 census, its population was 379, in 74 families.

References 

Populated places in Urmia County